Thiselton-Dyer may refer to:
 Harriet Anne Thiselton-Dyer (née Hooker, 1854–1945), British botanical illustrator, wife of William Turner Thiselton-Dyer
 T. F. Thiselton-Dyer (1848–1923), British clergyman
 William Turner Thiselton-Dyer (1843–1928), British botanist

See also
Thiselton (disambiguation)
Dyer (surname)

Compound surnames
English-language surnames